Hipparchus is an impact crater in the Phaethontis quadrangle of Mars, located at 44.8° S latitude and 151.4° W longitude. It was named after the ancient Greek astronomer Hipparchus in 1973.

Channels
There is abundant evidence that water once flowed in river valleys on Mars.  Images of curved channels have been seen in images from Mars spacecraft dating back to the early seventies with the Mariner 9 orbiter.  Indeed, a study published in June 2017, calculated that the volume of water needed to carve all the channels on Mars was even larger than the proposed ocean that the planet may have had.  Water was probably recycled many times from the ocean to rainfall around Mars.  Some of the pictures on this page show channels in Hipparchus Crater.

Gallery

See also
 List of craters on Mars

References 

Phaethontis quadrangle
Impact craters on Mars